The Philippine House Committee on Banks and Financial Intermediaries, or House Banks and Financial Intermediaries Committee is a standing committee of the Philippine House of Representatives.

Jurisdiction 
As prescribed by House Rules, the committee's jurisdiction includes the following:
 Banking and currency
 Government-owned or controlled banks and financial institutions
 Insurance
 Non-government banks and financial institutions
 Securities and securities exchange

Members, 18th Congress

Historical members

18th Congress

Member for the Majority 
 Nestor Fongwan (Benguet–Lone, PDP–Laban)

See also 
 House of Representatives of the Philippines
 List of Philippine House of Representatives committees
 Securities and Exchange Commission
 Philippine Stock Exchange

Notes

References

External links 
House of Representatives of the Philippines

Banks and Financial Intermediaries
Finance in the Philippines